Goodbye, Franziska (German:Auf Wiedersehn, Franziska) may refer to:

 Goodbye, Franziska (novel), a novel by Heinrich Heining
 Goodbye, Franziska (1941 film), a German film directed by Helmut Käutner
 Goodbye, Franziska (1957 film), a German film directed by Wolfgang Liebeneiner